Shykhly is a village in the Shabran District of Azerbaijan.

References 

Populated places in Shabran District